The Eastern Canadian Ringette Championships (ECRC) are competitions in the sport of ringette between provinces of eastern Canada. The inaugural year for the event was in 2002. The tournament was suspended for the 2020 and 2021 seasons due to the COVID-19 pandemic, and recommenced in 2022.

The championships are contested in four divisions: Under-14 A and AA (U14), Under-16 A (U16), Under-19 A (U19), and U18+ A (open), between the provinces of Nova Scotia, Prince Edward Island, New Brunswick, Quebec and Ontario.

Venue
The Eastern Canadian Ringette Championships rotate locations between the five provinces of Ontario, Quebec, New Brunswick, Nova Scotia, and Prince Edward Island.

Champions by year and division

2002 Host - Quebec

2003 Host - Nova Scotia

2004 Host - Ontario

2005 Host - New Brunswick

2006 Host - Nova Scotia

2007 Host - PEI

2008 Host - Quebec

2009 Host - Ontario

2010 Host - New Brunswick

2011 Host - Charlottetown, PEI

2012 Host - Mascouche, Quebec

2013 Host - Halifax (Bedford), Nova Scotia

2014 Host - Mississauga, Ontario - Mississauga Ringette Association

2015 Host - New Brunswick -

2016 Host - Charlottetown, PEI

2017 Host - Pierrefonds, Quebec

2018 Host - Halifax, Nova Scotia

2019 Host - Oshawa, Ontario

2022 Host - Halifax, Nova Scotia

References

Ringette
Ringette competitions
2002 establishments in Canada
Recurring sporting events established in 2002
Sports competitions in Nova Scotia
Sports competitions in New Brunswick
Sports competitions in Ontario
Sports competitions in Quebec
Sports competitions in Prince Edward Island